Sunfield can refer to a community in the United States:

 The village of Sunfield, Michigan
 Sunfield Township, Michigan